Erica purgatoriensis is a species of flowering plant in the heath and heather family Ericaceae, native to the Cape Provinces of South Africa. Known from only one location, a wetland alongside a road, and with around 500 mature individuals occupying an area of about one hectare, it is assessed as Vulnerable.

References

purgatoriensis
Endemic flora of South Africa 
Flora of the Cape Provinces
Plants described in 1965